Freddie Nicholas Overbury Steward (born 5 December 2000) is an English professional rugby union player who primarily plays fullback for Leicester Tigers in the English Premiership. He has also represented England at international level, having made his test debut against the United States during the 2021 Summer Internationals. Steward has previously played for clubs such as Ampthill in the past.

Youth rugby
Steward started playing rugby at Swaffham RFC, but at ten year's old he moved to Holt RFC as Swaffham's age group folded. He initially played fly half, before moving to inside centre at Norwich School and settling at full back at 16. Steward came through the Leicester Tigers academy.

Career

Professional career
Steward made his senior debut as a replacement on 26 January 2019 in a 47–20 defeat to Northampton Saints at Franklin's Gardens in the Premiership Rugby Cup.  Two weeks later Steward was back playing for Leicester's under-18 side as they won a second successive league title.

Steward was a late call-up to the bench on 8 March 2019 to make his Premiership Rugby debut as a replacement in a 32–5 defeat to Sale Sharks at the AJ Bell Stadium. His first appearance at Welford Road was in a Premiership Rugby Cup on 27 September 2019 against Exeter Chiefs. Steward scored his first try for Leicester in a 2019-20 European Rugby Challenge Cup against Calvisano.

Steward was highlighted as one of the potential breakout players in the 2019-20 Premiership Rugby season by Rugbypass.

On 3 January 2020 Steward was named in the England under 20 squad for the 2020 Six Nations Championship. He scored his first England try on 13 November 2021, after taking a pass from Marcus Smith he rounded full-back Kurtley Beale for a first half score as England beat  32–15.

In May 2022 Steward was named as the Rugby Players' Association Player's Young player of the year and England men's player of the season, as well as being named in their inaugural under-23 team of the season. He started the 2022 Premiership Rugby final as Tigers beat Saracens 15–12.

Steward was selected for the 2022 England rugby union tour of Australia, starting at full back in all three tests as England won the series 2–1.  On his first match for Leicester of the 2022-23 Premiership Rugby season, Steward scored a hat-trick in the 250th East Midlands derby as Leicester beat Northampton 41–21. On 28 September 2022, Steward extended his contract at Leicester.

On 21 November 2022, Steward was named in World Rugby's team of the year as the best full back.

Steward sometimes kicks penalties from long range.

International tries

References

External links

2000 births
Living people
England international rugby union players
English rugby union players
Leicester Tigers players
Rugby union fullbacks
Rugby union players from East Dereham